Yeltsin Ignacio Tejeda Valverde (born 17 March 1992) is a Costa Rican professional footballer who plays for Liga FPD club Herediano and the Costa Rica national team.

He is named after the first President of Russia Boris Yeltsin.

Club career

Saprissa
Tejeda began his career with Saprissa in 2011 scoring one goal against San Carlos. In the 2014 Verano season, Tejeda was named the captain of the team.

Evian
After Costa Rica's campaign at the 2014 FIFA World Cup, Tejeda traveled to the United Kingdom to sign with Swansea City, but the club halted the negotiations, and Tejeda instead traveled to France. On 22 August 2014, then-Ligue 1 club Evian announced that Tejeda had signed a four-year contract. He scored his first goal for the club on 19 September 2014 in a 2–1 loss to Bordeaux. During the winter transfer window, Tejeda was joined by his countryman and former Saprissa teammate David Ramírez. The team was relegated to Ligue 2 at the end of the season.

Lausanne-Sport
In July 2016 Tejeda joined Swiss club Lausanne-Sport on a three year contract.

Herediano
In January 2019 Tejeda returned to Costa Rica, signing with Herediano. He signed a two-year contract extension with the club in October 2021.

International career
Tejeda was selected in Costa Rica's squad for the 2009 CONCACAF U-17 Championship and he was named in the 2011 CONCACAF U-20 Championship. He played for his country at the 2009 FIFA U-17 and 2011 FIFA U-20 World Cups.

He officially debuted in the senior Costa Rica national football team on 11 December 2011 in a friendly match against Cuba, in Havana and has, as of November 2014, earned a total of 30 caps, scoring no goals. Tejeda was a key part during Costa Rica's successful qualification to the 2014 FIFA World Cup and during the finals tournament. He also played at the 2013 Copa Centroamericana and 2013 CONCACAF Gold Cup.

In May 2018 he was named in Costa Rica's 23 man squad for the 2018 FIFA World Cup in Russia.

In November 2022, Tejeda was named to Costa Rica's 26-man squad for the 2022 FIFA World Cup. On December 1 in Costa Rica's final group stage game, he scored his first goal for Costa Rica against Germany in a 4-2 defeat.

Career statistics

International

Costa Rica score listed first, score column indicates score after each Tejeda goal.

References

External links

1992 births
Living people
People from Limón Province
Association football midfielders
Costa Rican footballers
Costa Rica international footballers
Costa Rica under-20 international footballers
Copa Centroamericana-winning players
Deportivo Saprissa players
Thonon Evian Grand Genève F.C. players
FC Lausanne-Sport players
C.S. Herediano footballers
Liga FPD players
Ligue 1 players
Ligue 2 players
Swiss Super League players
Costa Rican expatriate footballers
Expatriate footballers in France
Costa Rican expatriate sportspeople in France
Expatriate footballers in Switzerland
Costa Rican expatriate sportspeople in Switzerland
Costa Rica youth international footballers
2013 Copa Centroamericana players
2013 CONCACAF Gold Cup players
2014 FIFA World Cup players
Copa América Centenario players
2017 CONCACAF Gold Cup players
2018 FIFA World Cup players
2021 CONCACAF Gold Cup players
2022 FIFA World Cup players